General Sir Edward Selby Smyth,  (31 March 1819 22 September 1896) was a British General. He served as the first General Officer Commanding the Militia of Canada from 1874 to 1880.

Military career
Educated at Putney College in Surrey, Smyth was commissioned in to the 2nd Queen's Royal Regiment in 1841. He went straight to India only returning with his Regiment to England as Adjutant of his Battalion in 1846. He went to South Africa in 1851 to protect the administration of the Orange River Sovereignty from attack by the Basotho and Khoikhoi people.

In 1853 he was made Deputy Adjutant and Quartermaster-General of the 2nd Division in South Africa and then Adjutant and Quartermaster-General at British Army Headquarters in South Africa.

In 1861 he was appointed Inspector-General of the Militia in Ireland and was involved in suppressing the early stages of the Fenian Rising. He was appointed General Officer Commanding British Troops in Mauritius in 1870.

He was made General Officer Commanding the Militia of Canada in 1874: he carried out the role successfully and was thanked by the Governor-General of Canada for protecting Montreal from rioting.

Family
In 1848 he married Lucy Sophia Julia Campbell, daughter of Major-General Sir Guy Campbell, 1st Baronet and Pamela FitzGerald.

References

 
 

|-

|-

|-

1819 births
1896 deaths
Military personnel from Belfast
British Army generals
Canadian generals
Knights Commander of the Order of St Michael and St George
Queen's Royal Regiment officers
Commanders of the Canadian Army